Under Heaven, also known as In the Shadows, is a 1998 American drama film directed by Meg Richman and starring Joely Richardson, Aden Young, and Molly Parker. The film premiered at the 1998 Sundance Film Festival and received a limited release on July 17, 1998. The story is a modern reworking of the Henry James novel The Wings of the Dove.

Plot 
In Seattle, Cynthia and Buck are a pair of struggling musicians. The ambitious Cynthia decides to break up with Buck, who is unemployed and has a drug addiction. She answers an ad for a live-in caretaker placed by Eleanor Dunston, a wealthy, terminally ill woman. After Cynthia is hired, the two women gradually form a bond despite coming from opposite ends of the economic spectrum. However, Cynthia harbors an envy of Eleanor's luxurious life.

Buck comes back into Cynthia's life when she accidentally runs into him. Realizing she is still in love with Buck, who now claims to be sober, Cynthia arranges for him to work at Eleanor's house and introduces him as her half-brother. Buck secures a job as a gardener for Eleanor. At nights he meets up for trysts with Cynthia.

Cynthia notices Eleanor developing a physical attraction to Buck and subsequently comes up with a scheme that she believes will solve her and Buck's problems. The plan involves Buck courting Eleanor. Buck is at first reluctant to do so, but soon a tempestuous ménage à trois-like relationship forms between the three of them.

Cast 
 Joely Richardson as Eleanor Dunston
 Aden Young as Buck
 Molly Parker as Cynthia
 Kevin Phillip as John
 Krisha Fairchild as Cynthia's Mother
 Marjorie Nelson as Mrs. Fletcher

Release 
The film premiered not long after the release of another adaptation of The Wings of the Dove, directed by Iain Softley.

Reception 
Emanuel Levy of Variety gave a negative review, writing that the film is "marred by an obvious narrative, shallow psychological motivations and pat ending". Though he praised Richardson's acting, Levy wrote, "Deviating from James’ great and complex novel, in which emotional ambiguity and moral dilemmas prevail up to the end, Richman's script is too simplistic. Its incidental humor is not enough to make the yarn engaging."

Ruthe Stein of the San Francisco Chronicle was more positive, writing that compared to Softley's film, "what this version lacks in lavishness it makes up for in raw emotion". Stein was also complimentary of Richman's visual style, the Seattle scenery, and Richman's "bold decision to graphically portray the illness". Criticisms were mainly of the film's script, which Richard von Busack of Metro Silicon Valley described as having "the scent of secondhand experience, the air of student drama, complete with blocky morals; a happy, beautiful death; and a preposterous renunciation."

Joely Richardson was nominated for an Independent Spirit Award for Best Supporting Female for her performance.

References

External links 

1998 drama films
1998 films
1998 directorial debut films
1998 independent films
1998 romantic drama films
Films about cancer
Films about social class
Films based on American novels
Films based on works by Henry James
American drama films
Films set in Seattle
1990s English-language films
1980s English-language films
1990s American films